Bruton is a surname. Notable people with the surname include:

Bill Bruton, center fielder for the Milwaukee Braves
Cal Bruton, head coach of the West Sydney Razorbacks
C. J. Bruton, basketball player with the New Zealand Breakers
Jack Bruton, English footballer, born as John Bruton
Jenna Bruton, North Melbourne Football Club AFLW player
Jo Bruton (born 1967), British artist
John Bruton, former Irish Taoiseach, Ambassador of the European Union to the United States of America
Kris Bruton, American basketball player
Lauren Bruton (born 1992), English association footballer
Niall Bruton, middle-distance runner
Ogden Bruton, paediatrician and immunologist
Paul Bruton, American law professor
Quintilla Geer Bruton, American philanthropist and library advocate
Richard Bruton, former Deputy Leader of Fine Gael and Opposition Spokesperson on Finance in Ireland